The R572 is a Regional Route in South Africa.

Route
Its south-western origin is the R510 near the Botswana border. It heads north-east, crossing the N11 at Tom Burke. It passes through Swartwater, after which it heads east and crosses the R568 at Maasstroom. At Alldays, it meets the north-south R521 and is co-signed north for around 60 kilometres. Just before reaching Pontdrif border post it heads east to end at Musina at the N1.

References

Regional Routes in Limpopo